Jean Strydom (born 3 April 1995) is a South African cricketer. He made his Twenty20 debut for Western Province in the 2017 Africa T20 Cup on 25 August 2017.

References

External links
 

1995 births
Living people
South African cricketers
Western Province cricketers
Place of birth missing (living people)